Kevin Jeon (born September 3, 1993) is an American soccer player who plays as a midfielder.

Career
On January 28, 2017, Jeon joined United Soccer League side Orange County SC after spending the previous years with CD Santurtzi in Spain and Blau-Weiß Friesdorf in Germany.

References

External links

1993 births
Living people
American soccer players
Orange County SC players
California United Strikers FC players
Association football midfielders
Soccer players from Los Angeles
USL Championship players
American expatriate soccer players
American expatriate sportspeople in Spain
Expatriate footballers in Spain
American expatriate soccer players in Germany
National Premier Soccer League players
National Independent Soccer Association players